Daniel Stanislavjevic (born July 9, 1971) is an American middleweight boxer. His current record is 8-18-3. Stanislavjevic was born  in Vancouver, British Columbia, Canada.

See also

References

External links

Canadian male boxers
Middleweight boxers
Sportspeople from Vancouver
American people of Canadian descent
1971 births
Living people